Germany was represented by Mary Roos, with the song "Aufrecht geh'n", at the 1984 Eurovision Song Contest, which took place on 5 May in Luxembourg City. "Aufrecht geh'n" was the winner of the German national final, held on 29 March. Roos had previously represented Germany in the 1972 contest in Edinburgh, where she had finished third.

The song is a power ballad, with Roos bidding a former lover goodbye at the end of a relationship. She tells herself to "walk tall" and tells him that she will not be waiting for him if he comes back - as she assumes he will. Roos also recorded the song in English and French, then entitled "I'll Walk Tall" and "Du blues et du bleu" respectively.

Before Eurovision

Ein Lied für Luxemburg
The final was held at the Deutsches Theater in Munich, hosted by Sabine Sauer. 12 songs took part and the winner was chosen by a panel of approximately 500 people who had been selected as providing a representative cross-section of the German public.

At Eurovision 
On the night of the final Roos performed 14th in the running order, following Austria and preceding Turkey. At the close of voting "Aufrecht geh'n" had received 34 points (the highest a 7 from Norway), placing Germany joint 13th (with the Netherlands) of the 19 entries. The German jury awarded its 12 points to contest winners Sweden.

Voting

References

1984
Countries in the Eurovision Song Contest 1984
Eurovision